Darrick Wood School is a mixed secondary school in Orpington, London Borough of Bromley, United Kingdom with a current roll of 1785 pupils. It was first opened in 1975.

Facilities

Darrick Wood consists of five separate buildings, named after the previous Head Teachers of the School. The Turner Building (English on the upper floor, DT, Science on the ground floor (with another separate building to accommodate more science classrooms)), The Barker Building (Maths, Support, Library "Reading Realm", Reception & Offices on the ground floor, Humanities, Vocational Education such as Business Studies on the first floor, Modern Foreign Languages on the second floor), The Rhymaun Building (Sixth Form on all floors, with an attachment to The Barker Building). There is a separate building commonly referred to as "The MPA Building", focusing on Drama & Theater and Phys Ed. This currently unnamed building also accommodates 3 classrooms currently in use for English, a gym, and a reception for Darrick Sports. The Main Hall is located on the north side of the site, which is used for assemblies and event hosting (such as open evenings and examinations). There are an extra two halls, both used for dining, and one is also used for hosting assemblies if The Main Hall is in use. One classroom and The Dance Studio is attached to The Main Hall's building. There are four cafeterias. Three in The Turner Building, and one in The Rhymaun Building. Each building also has its own respective staff room, but there is a main staff room located on the first floor of The Barker Building.

History 

The school opened in 1975. For the first two terms the students were accommodated at Charles Darwin School, Biggin Hill. The school expanded and when inspected in 2009, had Technology College status and has received a  Healthy School Award and Sportsmark Award. It was a Microsoft Academy, allowing professional qualifications to be offered to both students and members of public.
It converted to being an academy in 2010. It gained a Teaching school qualification in 2013 and the United Kingdoms World Class Schools Quality Mark which the previous school had gained, was confirmed in 2018.

Structure 
Darrick Wood School is a larger-than-average secondary academy which opened in December 1975, and converted to academy status in 2010. There is a hearing impairment resource provision within the school which is managed by the London Borough of Bromley. These pupils are fully integrated into the school.
The majority of pupils are from a white British background and the proportion of pupils who speak English as an additional language is significantly below the national average. The proportion of disadvantaged pupils is significantly below the national average; in the lowest 20% nationally.

Academics
Virtually all maintained schools and academies follow the National Curriculum, and are inspected by Ofsted on how well they succeed in delivering a 'broad and balanced curriculum'. Schools endeavour to get all students to achieve the English Baccalaureate(EBACC) qualification- this must include core subjects a modern or ancient foreign language, and either History or Geography.

Darrick Wood operates a three-year, Key Stage 3 where all the core National Curriculum subjects are taught. Year 7 is mainly taught in mixed ability tutor group set. In Year 8 and 9, Art, Drama, IT, Religious Studies and Music are taught  in mixed ability groups. English,  Mathematics,  Science,  Design  &  Technology,  Geography,  History,  Modern Foreign Languages and PE are set by ability.

In 10 and 11, that is in Key Stage 4 students study a core of English Language, English Literature, Mathematics, Science, IT, Core PE , PSHE  (Sex and Relationship Education with Enterprise  Education)) and Religious Education Most students do a Modern Foreign Language. Students have three options chosen from three pools, each of which contain History and Geography, allowing an English Baccalaureate. Some students are offered a more vocational route. These students study a slightly reduced number of GCSEs.

Head teachers
 Mr Turner (1975-1985)
 Mr Barker (1985-2000)
 Mrs Rhymaun (2000-2015)
 Dr Airey (2015- current)

Controversy 
In October 2007, a Darrick Wood member of staff was made redundant due to claims of stalking and sexual harassment of a teacher. In April 2009, an employment tribunal confirmed these allegations.

References

External links
 School Homepage

Academies in the London Borough of Bromley
Secondary schools in the London Borough of Bromley
Educational institutions established in 1975
1975 establishments in England
Orpington